Gardening Women: Their Stories From 1600 to the Present is a 2010 book on social history and horticulture and women's historical role in gardening and garden design by author and journalist Catherine Horwood. It was first published in hardback by the British publisher Little Brown under their imprint Virago.

Editions
Gardening Women was published in hardback, paperback and Kindle editions.

American edition
The American edition was published under the title Women and Their Gardens: A History from the Elizabethan Era to Today by the Chicago Review Press in 2012.

References

External links
 Catherine Horwood 
 Amazon Books Biography 
 Telegraph Author Interview 

2010 non-fiction books
Social history
Books about women
Virago Press books
Gardening books